Puthoor is a village in Thalassery taluk of Kannur district in Kerala state, India. Puthoor is located 15 km east of Thalassery and 10 km south of Kuthuparamba towns.

Demographics
As of 2011 Census, Puthoor had a population of 19,575 which constitute 9,051 (46.2%) males and 10,524 (53.8%) females. The average sex ratio was 1163 higher than the state average of 1084. In Puthoor, 11.9% of the population was under 6 years of age. Puthoor had average literacy of 95% higher than state average of 94%; male literacy was 97.3% and female literacy was 93.1%.

Administration
Puthoor village is part of Kunnothuparamba Grama Panchayat in Kuthuparamba Block Panchayat. Puthoor is politically part of Kuthuparamba (State Assembly constituency) under Vatakara Loksabha constituency.

References

Villages near Kuthuparamba